KF Drita Bogovinë is a football club based in Bogovinje, North Macedonia. They are currently competing in the Macedonian Third Football League (West Division).

History
The club was founded in 1994 under the name Bogovinje.

The biggest success of the club was playing in the Macedonian First League in the 2012–13 season, after the promotion from the Macedonian Second League. Drita was relegated after the play-off against FK Gorno Lisiče which was ended in the 70th minute after the players of Drita left the ground because they were disappointed with the referee decisions.

Honours
Macedonian Second League:
Runners-up (1): 2011–12

Current squad

References

External links
Drita Facebook 
Club info at MacedonianFootball 
Football Federation of Macedonia 

Football clubs in North Macedonia
KF Drita
Association football clubs established in 1994
1994 establishments in the Republic of Macedonia
Drita